The 2012–13 season is Brøndby's 32nd consecutive season in the top flight of Danish football, 23rd consecutive season in the Danish Superliga, and 47th year in existence as a football club.

Competitions

Danish Superliga

Danish Cup

References 

2012-13
Brondby